Grodzisk Mazowiecki railway station is a railway station serving Grodzisk Mazowiecki in Grodzisk Mazowiecki County, Poland. It is classed as Category B on the classification of Polish railway stations and is served exclusively by Koleje Mazowieckie, which runs services from Skierniewice to Warszawa Wschodnia.

It was built as part of the first stage of the Warsaw–Vienna railway: the  stretch from Warsaw to Grodzisk Mazowiecki opened on 14 June 1845. The station became a through station on 15 October 1845 when the line to Skierniewice was opened.

Train services
The station is served by the following service(s):
Intercity services (TLK) Warszawa - Częstochowa - Katowice - Opole - Wrocław - Szklarska Poręba Górna
Intercity services (TLK) Gdynia Główna — Zakopane 
 InterRegio services (IR) Łódź Fabryczna — Warszawa Glowna 
 InterRegio services (IR) Łódź Kaliska — Warszawa Glowna 
 InterRegio services (IR) Ostrów Wielkopolski — Łódź — Warszawa Główna
 InterRegio services (IR) Poznań Główny — Ostrów Wielkopolski — Łódź — Warszawa Główna

References

Station article at kolej.one.pl

External links 
 

Railway stations in Poland opened in 1845
Kasprzaka
Railway stations served by Koleje Mazowieckie
Grodzisk Mazowiecki County